World of Boxing is a Russian promotion company, which organizes professional boxing fights.
 
The company was founded in 2012 by MIC Group president Andrey Ryabinskiy. The first fight between Wladimir Klitschko и Alexander Povetkin organized by the company was held on October 5, 2013 with the support of Rosneft. A number of Russian boxers worked with the company, including:
 
  Alexander Povetkin — WBA World Heavyweight Champion (2011–13)
  Denis Lebedev — WBA World Champion (2012–18)
  Eduard Troyanovsky — IBF World Champion (2015–16) and IBO World Champion (2015–16)
  Rakhim Chakhkiev — EBU European Cruiserweight Champion (2014)
  Grigory Drozd — WBC World Champion (2014–15)
  Dmitry Bivol — WBA World Champion (since 2017)
  Dmitry Kudryashov — International WBA Champion (2014–16)
  Sergei Kuzmin — WBA Inter-Continental Champion (2018–19)
  Alexei Papin — IBF International Light heavyweight Champion (since 2019, 2018–19)
  Shakhram Giyasov — WBA International Super Lightweight Champion
  Murodjon Akhmadaliev — WBA Inter-Continental Super Bantamweight Champion
  Batuhan Gözgeç — WBA Super lightweight Champion
  Bektemir Melikuziev — The 2016 Summer Olympics silver medalist
  Elnur Abduraimov — winner of the Asian Amateur Boxing Championships
  Sergey Lipinets — IBF World Junior welterweight Champion.
 
Since 2017, Vadim Kornilov is the acting head of the company. Since then, Mir Boksa has ceased to hold major boxing events as was done in previous years.

List of events

References

Boxing promoters
Boxing in Russia
2012 establishments in Russia